The women's 5000 metres at the 2015 World Championships in Athletics was held at the Beijing National Stadium on 27 and 30 August. The reigning champion from 2013 Meseret Defar was absent from the competition, having not yet returned from a career break to start a family.

Summary
From the gun in the final, the two Japanese runner Misaki Onishi then Ayuko Suzuki took the pace out at a serious level, the women running the same pace as the pedestrian men's race through the first 2,000.  After her 1500 metres win and world record, all eyes were clearly on Genzebe Dibaba.  On the first lap Dibaba went to the back of the pack.  After a lap she decided to move in behind the Japanese runners.  Instantly she was marked by world leader Almaz Ayana.  Three laps into the race, it was a string of African runners behind the Japanese, with a gap back to all the other non-Africans.  From the pace of just under 74 seconds a lap, Ayana then upped the pace, followed immediately by Dibaba and the Kenyan team running as a group led by returning silver medalist Mercy Cherono.  Laps started getting quicker, 68, 67, the field stringing out 65, 64 first only Dibaba was able to follow Ayana, then she was broken, Ayana out into an insurmountable lead with three laps to go and still accelerating.  More than a hundred metres behind, Senbere Teferi was battling the last of the Kenyans, Viola Kibiwot for the bronze medal position.  Ayana slowed a little over the last two laps, the pace falling back to 67 seconds but the damage was done and the race was decided.  Ayana pushed home in 14:26.83 to break Genzebe's sister Tirunesh Dibaba's Championship Record.  Well behind, Genzebe was content to just finish the race in silver medal position, but the battle for bronze was accelerating.  Onto the home stretch, Teferi put her best move on Kibiwot and was sprinting home, but in the process she passed the slowing Dibaba.  Dibaba finally noticed Teferi passing and turned into sprinting making for a close finish but Teferi had the edge and took the silver medal.

It was a sweep for Ethiopia but not from a tactical situation like many Kenyan team members try to run.  These were three rivals who in the process of beating each other, beat the rest of the world.  Behind them, the straightaway was empty, it took 15 more seconds for the next Kenyan runner to arrive.

Records
Prior to the competition, the records were as follows:

Qualification standards

Schedule

Results

Heats
Qualification: First 5 in each heat (Q) and the next 5 fastest (q) advanced to the final.

Final
The final was started at 19:15

References

5000
5000 metres at the World Athletics Championships
2015 in women's athletics